Albano Bortoletto Cavallin (25 April 1930 – 1 February 2017) was a Brazilian Roman Catholic prelate. 

Born in Lapa, Paraná, Bortoletto Cavallin was ordained to the priesthood in 1953. He served as the Bishop of Guarapuava from 1986 to 1992, and later served as the Archbishop of Londrina from 1992 until his retirement in 2006. He died from surgical complications on 1 February 2017 in Londrina at the age of 86.

See also
Catholic Church in Brazil

References

1930 births
2017 deaths
20th-century Roman Catholic archbishops in Brazil
21st-century Roman Catholic archbishops in Brazil
Roman Catholic archbishops of Londrina
Roman Catholic bishops of Guarapuava
Brazilian Roman Catholic archbishops